Jeff Miller is a zine publisher and writer. He began writing in 1996 with an Ottawa zine called Otaku, which later changed its name to Ghost Pine following his move to Montreal in 1999. It has sold nearly 10,000 copies, which is relatively high for underground publishing in Canada. He writes largely about punk and other sub-cultures.

The best of his works were compiled into a book, Ghost Pine: All Stories True by Invisible Publishing in 2010. It was on the Montreal Gazette'''s top-10 bestseller's list for three weeks, and won the Best Book category at Montreal's 2010 Expozine Alternative Press Awards.

Miller was born and grew up in Ottawa, where he began writing on the hardcore punk scene in the mid-90s. He lived in Montreal on and off from 1999 to the late 2000s and currently resides on Nova Scotia's Eastern Shore.

His work has been included in anthologies like The Art of Trespassing, and he has embarked upon small US and Canadian reading tours with celebrated zine writers Cindy Crabb (Doris'' zine), Erica Lyle (SCAM zine), and Aaron Cometbus. He is also involved in the writing workshop Soulgazers and  speaks at events like Expozine, an annual fair for that brings together about 300 creators linked to small presses, comics and zines. Miller has spoken about the future of paper-print publishing.

Bibliography

References

External links
 Official Website
 Contributor Page at Cult MTL
 
 Jeff Miller Interview zinenation.org (2 August 2014)
 

Canadian non-fiction writers
Living people
Year of birth uncertain
1979 births